The Big Oyster: History on the Half Shell is a book by Mark Kurlansky. It follows the history of New York City and the renowned oyster beds in the New York–New Jersey Harbor Estuary.

Errors
The book states that "an Oyster has a brain", but they do not. (pp. 50).
George Washington never had children, but the book states Philip, the son of Washington, was put in charge of redistributing Loyalist-held properties in New York City after the Revolutionary War (pp. 92).
The book states that Robert Fulton invented the submarine (p. 98), but this statement distorts the history of submarines; various people had envisioned submarines in earlier eras, and a few had been built (such as the Turtle).
The book states that the 3477 deaths at the Battle of Shiloh during the Civil War was almost equal to the number who died in all eight years of the Revolutionary War (pp. 201). However about 8000 American Revolutionaries died in battle, with 25,000 dead from all causes over the course of that war.

References

External links
The Big Oyster on GoogleBooks
  - New York Times book review

History of New York City
2006 non-fiction books
Aquaculture in the United States
Books about food and drink
Oysters